The 1994 Kentucky Wildcats football team represented the University of Kentucky in the Southeastern Conference (SEC) during the 1994 NCAA Division I-A football season.  In their fifth season under head coach Bill Curry, the Wildcats compiled a 1–10 record (0–8 against SEC opponents), finished in last place in the Eastern Division of the SEC, and were outscored by their opponents, 405 to 149.  The team won its season opener against Louisville (20–14), but then lost the final ten games of the season, including blowout losses to Florida (7–73), Indiana (29–59), Mississippi State (7–47), and Tennessee (0–52).  The team played its home games in Commonwealth Stadium in Lexington, Kentucky.

The team's statistical leaders included Antonio O'Ferral with 642 passing yards, Moe Williams with 805 rushing yards, and Leon Smith with 375 receiving yards.

Schedule

References

Kentucky
Kentucky Wildcats football seasons
Kentucky Wildcats football